is a 2012 Japanese tokusatsu film directed by Tomoki Sano.

Cast
 Shintaro Yamada - Uruma/Ryujin Mabuyer 
 Issa - Saion/Ryujin Ganasea 
 Sachiko Fukumoto - Airi 
 Yukihito Nagahama - Kijimun 
 Hiroki Kawata - Teacher Tamaki 
 Taeko Yoshida - Obâ 
 YASU - Aman 
 TAKANO - Kuman 
 Yuria Shiina - Magoochu 
 Tamotsu Ebina - Neiger/Ken Akita 
 Ken Maeda (voice cast) - Jinbêdar 
 Gori -  Habu-devil

See also
 Ryujin Mabuyer
 Chōjin Neiger

References

External links
  

Films based on television series
Tokusatsu films
Films directed by Tomoki Sano
Films set in Okinawa Prefecture
2012 films
2010s Japanese films